This article contains information about the literary events and publications of 1606.

Events
January? – Sir Thomas Craig becomes church procurator.
February – John Day's satirical play The Isle of Gulls causes a scandal which sends several of the young actors from the Children of the Chapel to prison for short periods.
Spring – Ben Jonson's satirical play Volpone is first performed, by the King's Men at the Globe Theatre in London.
May 27 – The English Parliament passes An Act to Restrain Abuses of Players, tightening censorship controls on public theatre performances, notably in relation to profane oaths.
August 7 – Possible first performance of Shakespeare's Macbeth, with Richard Burbage in the title role, amongst a series of plays presented by the King's Men before Kings James I of England and Christian IV of Denmark (his brother-in-law) at Hampton Court Palace in England.
November 14 – Marc Lescarbot's dramatic poem Théâtre de Neptune is performed at the Habitation at Port-Royal, Nova Scotia, the first theatrical performance in North America.
December 26 (St. Stephen's Day) – Shakespeare's King Lear is performed at Court before King James I of England. The title role is played by Richard Burbage and the Fool by Robert Armin.

New books

Prose
Thomas Dekker
The Double PP
News From Hell
Salvator Fabris – Lo Schermo, overo Scienza D'Arme
Philemon Holland – The Historie of Twelve Caesars, a translation of Suetonius's De vita Caesarum

Drama
Anonymous (published)
The Returne from Pernassus, or The Scourge of Simony
Wily Beguiled
Anonymous (probably Thomas Middleton) – The Revenger's Tragedy
George Chapman
Sir Giles Goosecap (attributed; published)
The Gentleman Usher (published)
Monsieur D'Olive (published)
John Day – The Isle of Gulls
Lope de Vega
El anzuelo de Fenisa (Fenisa's Hook)

El gran duque de Moscovia
Ben Jonson
Volpone
Hymenaei
John Marston
The Wonder of Women, or the Tragedy of Sophonisba
Parasitaster, or The Fawn (published)
Thomas Middleton (attributed) – The Puritan, or, The Widow of Watling-Street (probable date)
William Shakespeare
Macbeth (possible first performance)
King Lear (first recorded performance)
Edward Sharpham – The Fleir

Poetry
Hieronim Morsztyn – Światowa Rozkosz (Worldly Pleasure)
Jean Passerat (posthumous) – Recueil des œuvres poétiques

Births
February 28 – William Davenant, English poet and dramatist (died 1668)
March 3 – Edmund Waller, English poet (died 1687)
May 12 – Joachim von Sandrart, German art historian (died 1688)
June 6 – Pierre Corneille, French dramatist (died 1684)
Unknown dates
Pierre du Ryer, French dramatist (died 1658)
Junije Palmotić, Ragusan dramatist and poet (died 1657)

Deaths
May 13 (burial) – Arthur Golding, English translator (born c. 1536)
May 17 – Niccolò Orlandini, Italian Jesuit writer (born 1554)
May 30 – Guru Arjan, Sikh Guru and compiler of scriptures (in custody, born 1563)
September 28 – Nicolaus Taurellus, German philosopher and theologian (born 1547)
October 5 – Philippe Desportes, French poet (born 1546)
November 13 – Girolamo Mercuriale, Italian philologist and medical writer (born 1530)
November 20 (burial) – John Lyly, English dramatist, poet and novelist (born c. 1553)
November 22 – Sir Henry Billingsley, English translator (birth year unknown)
Unknown date – Lucas Janszoon Waghenaer – Dutch cartographer (born 1533/1534)

References

 
Years of the 17th century in literature